Lucas Pezzini Leiva (born 9 January 1987), known as Lucas or Lucas Leiva, is a Brazilian former professional footballer who played as a defensive midfielder for Grêmio, Liverpool, Lazio and Brazil.

Lucas began his career as a box-to-box midfielder at Grêmio where he won the Campeonato Gaúcho in 2006 and 2007. In July 2007 he moved to Liverpool, where he played 347 professional matches over the course of a decade, winning the League Cup in 2012. Between 2010 and 2016 Lucas led the Premier League in tackles per game five times in six seasons. He has the second most tackles in Premier League history, and remains the Brazilian with the 3rd most Premier League appearances. He joined Lazio in 2017.

A full international since 2007, he has earned 24 caps and represented Brazil at the 2008 Olympics and 2011 Copa América, winning a bronze medal at the former. He also captained the under-20 team to victory in the 2007 South American Youth Championship.

Club career

Grêmio
Born in Dourados, Mato Grosso do Sul, Lucas began his career at Grêmio as a midfielder in 2005. The following year was a successful year for him, as Grêmio won the Rio Grande do Sul state championship (the Campeonato Gaúcho) for the first time since 2001, and also came third in the Campeonato Brasileiro Série A. Lucas also became the youngest player ever to receive Placar magazine's Bola de Ouro (Golden Ball), given to the best player in the Campeonato Brasileiro – an honour previously won by the likes of Zico, Falcão, Careca, Alex, Romário, Robinho, Kaká and Carlos Tevez.

His form in 2006 led to reported interest from many major European clubs including offers from top Spanish clubs and Internazionale. It was Liverpool that proved most attractive to the player, however, and on 13 May 2007, the club confirmed they had signed the player from Grêmio before the start of the 2007–08 season. The transfer fee was in the region of £6 million.

Liverpool

2007–2009
On 26 July 2007, he was officially unveiled as a Liverpool player for a fee of £5 million and was given international clearance to compete in the final of the Barclays Asia Trophy.

By late November, manager Rafael Benítez gave Lucas his chance to start a game in the Liverpool midfield after easing him in during his first few months at the club. Lucas scored his first goal for Liverpool on 27 January 2008 when he curled a 25-yard shot into the top corner during an FA Cup match against Havant & Waterlooville, becoming the first-ever Brazilian to score for Liverpool.

The start of the 2008–09 season signified an important turning point for his career. Many commentators expected him to step up to the next level after completing his first season with the Reds. The Brazilian got off to a good start with a well taken opening goal in a 2–1 friendly win over Swiss side Lucerne in July. He impressed in pre-season games but missed the start of Premier League season due to his selection for the Brazilian Olympic Team in the Beijing Olympics.

Lucas returned with a bronze medal and Benítez had high hopes for the Brazilian's future, stating, "This season he will improve because he is a very, very good professional and has experience of the Olympic Games." Lucas noted that Liverpool's squad was much improved from the previous season and relished the opportunity to compete for trophies, despite the increased difficulty of getting a first-team place. However, after a number of disappointing performances, both critics and fans voiced concerns about Lucas' quality and his confidence was further knocked when Liverpool fans booed him after a lacklustre draw against Fulham. The criticism irked Benítez and he responded with a passionate defence of the player, saying that "people just don't know how good Lucas is." Benítez also underlined Lucas' credentials, stating that he had been captain for both Grêmio and his national youth team, and that competing for place against Javier Mascherano, Steven Gerrard and Xabi Alonso was inherently difficult. Lucas' performances in December 2008 for Liverpool drew him much praise from pundits, the highlight being his performance in the 5–1 thrashing of Newcastle United, where he provided an assist for Gerrard. Lucas was sent off in a cup tie against Mersey rivals Everton, which Liverpool lost. This compounded his growing unpopularity amongst Liverpool's supporters, after he gave away a late penalty in Liverpool's previous match, a 1–1 draw with Wigan Athletic.

On 14 March, Lucas played a key role  in Liverpool's 4–1 victory over Manchester United at Old Trafford, starting in place of the injured Xabi Alonso. On 14 April, Lucas played against Chelsea in the Champions League, in place of Steven Gerrard. He scored a goal with his long-range effort in the 81st minute deflected off Michael Essien and past goalkeeper Petr Čech to make the score 3–3. Dirk Kuyt's header a minute later briefly gave Liverpool the lead, but Frank Lampard's 89th-minute strike leveled the score to 4–4, with Chelsea winning 7–5 on aggregate to go through to the semi-finals of the tournament.

On 3 May 2009, Lucas scored his first Premier League goal, a header from a free-kick for Liverpool against Newcastle United in a 3–0 win.

During the 2009–10 pre-season period, Lucas showed good form scoring Liverpool's only goal in a 2–1 loss against Atlético Madrid. This form earned praise from manager Rafael Benítez, and gained him a start against Tottenham Hotspur for the opening game of the 2009–10 season on 16 August. Liverpool lost 2–1, but Lucas earned praise for a solid performance all round.

2010–2013
On 8 April 2010, Lucas scored his second European goal for Liverpool, scoring in a 4–1 (5–3 aggregate) quarter-final win over Benfica in the UEFA Europa League quarter-finals.

In pre-season games before the 2010–11 season, Lucas was made captain of a youthful Liverpool side against Grasshopper. On 16 September 2010, Lucas scored his sixth goal for Liverpool shortly after replacing Ryan Babel in the club's first Europa League group stage match against Steaua București. The goal was Liverpool's third in a 4–1 victory and was scored from 22 yards. On 13 November, Lucas was sent off for the second time in his Liverpool career after being shown a second yellow card in injury time in Liverpool's 2–0 defeat to Stoke City. On 6 December, Lucas was voted the fan's pick for Man of the Match on the official Liverpool website. Lucas assisted a Ryan Babel goal in a 3–0 win over Aston Villa.

Lucas was awarded Liverpool Player of the Year Award in May 2011. On 30 March, Lucas signed a new long term contract at Liverpool.

After an excellent run of form for Liverpool, his season was unfortunately cut short on 1 December 2011, when it was confirmed he was out for the remainder of the season after he suffered an anterior cruciate ligament injury after he collided with Juan Mata in the 2–0 win over Chelsea in the quarter-final of the League Cup.

On 10 April 2013, Lucas signed a new long term deal with the club. He was a consistent starter in the opening few months of the 2013–14 season as Liverpool put up an unexpected title challenge, though his season was again cut short by injury. His good form saw him make a return to the Brazilian national team's squad.

2014–2017

In the initial run of games within the 2014–15 Premier League and other cup competitions, Lucas was rotated in and out of the squad, leading to speculation surrounding a move away from Anfield. He made his comeback, however, as a starter against Ludogorets in the Champions League with a good display. His fine form continued and he started games against Stoke City, Leicester City and Sunderland. Lucas' good run continued as Liverpool then played against Manchester United, Arsenal, Burnley, Swansea City, Leicester and Sunderland out of which Liverpool only lost to United and then achieved five games without defeat in a row with Lucas as an integral member. Lucas was on the substitute bench on 22 March in a 2–1 defeat against Manchester United after coming back from a six-week injury layoff.

Despite rumours of him leaving Anfield, Lucas was restored to the starting lineup. Following the sacking of manager Brendan Rodgers, Lucas under new manager Jürgen Klopp was praised for his excellent form in the club's 11-game unbeaten run. Lucas made his 300th appearance for Liverpool on 26 January 2016 against Stoke City in the Football League Cup semi-final at Anfield. Lucas captained the side in the Premier League match against Crystal Palace on 8 November, a 2–1 defeat for Liverpool.

On 28 February 2016, Lucas started for Liverpool in central defence in the 2016 Football League Cup Final. He was one of three Liverpool players who failed to score his kick as the team lost 3–1 in a penalty shootout to Manchester City.

On 18 January 2017, Lucas scored his first goal for the club since 16 September 2010, a first-half header in the FA Cup 3rd round replay against Plymouth Argyle. The end of the season marked the completion of Lucas's tenth year as a Liverpool player. In celebration, Lucas had a dinner party thrown in his honour and received a Special Recognition Award presented to him by club legend Kenny Dalglish at Liverpool's postseason award ceremony.

Lazio
On 18 July 2017, Lucas completed a move to Serie A side Lazio for £5 million, ending his 10-year stay at Liverpool.

2017–18 season 
Lucas made his official debut for the Rome club in a 3–2 win over league champions Juventus in the Supercoppa Italiana, on 13 August. His first goal for the club was in a 2–3 defeat to Zulte Waregem in the final group game of the UEFA Europa League. On 28 February 2018, Lucas missed a penalty during the penalty shootout in Lazio's match against Milan in the semi-finals of the Coppa Italia; which Lazio eventually lost 4–5.

On 15 March, Lucas scored the opening goal in a 2–0 away win over Dynamo Kyiv in the UEFA Europa League round of sixteen second leg, securing a 4–2 aggregate win and advancement into the quarter-finals of the tournament. On 18 March, Lucas scored his first league goal for the club in a 1–1 draw with Bologna, and on 1 April, he scored in a 6–2 win over Benevento.

He finished the season with 50 appearances in all competitions and was named the club's player of the year.

Return to Grêmio
On 27 June 2022, Lucas returned to Grêmio on a contract until December 2023. On 17 March 2023, he announced his retirement from professional football, a cardiac alteration was found the previous December.

International career

Lucas is the former captain of the Brazilian under-20 team. He led the team to victory in the 2007 South American Youth Championship, scoring four goals in the process. He was expected to lead the team again in the 2007 FIFA U-20 World Cup held in Canada in July 2007 and was named in their squad, but an injury in training kept him from playing for three weeks, leading to his withdrawal from the squad.

In October 2006, Lucas was included in the senior Brazilian squad for friendlies against Kuwaiti club Al-Kuwait and Ecuador. Lucas was both the youngest member and one of only two non-Europe based players in a strong squad. He made his debut for Brazil on 7 October 2006 coming on as a second-half substitute against Al-Kuwait. Brazil won the match 4–0, but his appearance did not count as his first cap—the match was not considered an official friendly match by FIFA.

Lucas gained his first official Brazil international cap on 22 August 2007, coming on as a substitute in a friendly against Algeria. In June 2008, Lucas was named in the Brazil squad for an Olympics warm-up match later in the month.

On 19 August, Lucas was shown a red card in the 2008 Olympics semi-final match between Brazil and Argentina, after a challenge on then Liverpool teammate Javier Mascherano, as Argentina ran out 3–0 winners. In August 2009, Lucas was recalled to the senior Brazil squad in place of Flamengo's Kléberson, who was absent through injury. After missing out on the Brazil world cup squad in South Africa, Lucas played the full 90 minutes in a friendly against the United States on 10 August 2010.

On 17 July 2011, Lucas was shown a straight red card in the 2011 Copa América play-off quarter final against Paraguay, after an extra time altercation with Antolín Alcaraz. Brazil went on to lose the match on penalties after the match had finished all square after 90 minutes.

Style of play
Although he is primarily deployed as a defensive midfielder, Lucas is also capable of playing as a makeshift central defender.

Personal life
Lucas is the nephew of former Brazilian footballer Leivinha and also holds an Italian passport due to his descent from the country.

In addition to his native Portuguese, Lucas can also speak English, Spanish, and Italian.

Career statistics

Club

International
Source:

Honours

Club

Grêmio
 Campeonato Brasileiro Série B: 2005
 Campeonato Gaúcho: 2006, 2007
 Copa Libertadores runner-up: 2007

Liverpool
 Football League Cup: 2011–12; runner-up: 2015–16
 UEFA Europa League runner-up: 2015–16

Lazio
 Coppa Italia: 2018–19
 Supercoppa Italiana: 2017, 2019

Individual
 Bola de Ouro: 2006
 Bola de Prata: 2006
 Campeonato Brasileiro Série A Team of the Year: 2006
 Liverpool Player of the Year: 2010–11
 Lazio Player of the Season: 2017–18, 2018–19

References

External links

 Profile at the Grêmio FBPA website
 

1987 births
Living people
Brazilian people of Italian descent
People from Dourados
Brazilian footballers
Association football midfielders
Grêmio Foot-Ball Porto Alegrense players
Liverpool F.C. players
S.S. Lazio players
Campeonato Brasileiro Série A players
Premier League players
Serie A players
Brazil youth international footballers
Brazil under-20 international footballers
Olympic footballers of Brazil
Brazil international footballers
Footballers at the 2008 Summer Olympics
2011 Copa América players
Olympic medalists in football
Medalists at the 2008 Summer Olympics
Olympic bronze medalists for Brazil
Brazilian expatriate footballers
Brazilian expatriate sportspeople in England
Brazilian expatriate sportspeople in Italy
Expatriate footballers in England
Expatriate footballers in Italy
Citizens of Italy through descent
Sportspeople from Mato Grosso do Sul